A tachanka was a horse-drawn cart (such as charabanc) or an open wagon with a heavy machine gun mounted on the rear side. A tachanka could be pulled by two to four horses and required a crew of two or three (one driver and a machine gun crew).

A number of sources attribute its invention to Nestor Makhno.

Etymology 
At least two plausible hypotheses account for the origin of the word tachanka.  Vasmer's etymological dictionary suggests that the word derives from Ukrainian netychanka ("нетичанка"), Polish najtyczanka, a type of a carriage named after the town of Neutitschein, present-day Nový Jičín in the Czech Republic. Another account references a  Ukrainian diminutive or endearing form of the word tachka (meaning "wheelbarrow'"). Still another etymology postulates a contracted form of the word tavrichanka - used for rugged carriages known in Southern Ukraine and Crimea, and derived from the name "Taurida" for this area.  However the latter derivation remains dubious: the tavrichanka, a large, rugged agricultural carriage, has a completely different design.

Adoption 

A regular civilian horse cart could be easily converted to military use and back.  This made the tachanka very popular during the Great War on the Eastern Front, where it was used by the Russian cavalry.  The use of tachankas reached its peak during the Russian Civil War (1917–1920s), particularly in the peasant regions of Southern Russia and Ukraine, on fronts where fluid mobile warfare gained much significance. With up to 4 horses abreast pulling a tachanka, it could easily keep up with cavalry units and support them with mobile firepower.

Tachanka tactics were centered around taking advantage of its speed to surprise the enemy.  Tachankas, before the introduction of the tank or automobile to the battlefield, were the only way to provide high-speed mobility for the heavy, bulky machine guns of World War I.  The speed of the horse-drawn cart would be used to move the machine gun platform to a favorable firing position, and then the enemy would be fired upon before they had a chance to react.  Since the machine gun pointed towards the rear of the cart, the tachankas also provided effective suppressive fire onto pursuing enemy cavalry after raids and during retreats. Ukrainian anarchist leader Nestor Makhno pioneered the use of the tachanka en masse during the Russian Civil War. Makhno's forces relied so heavily upon the use of the tachanka that one Makhnovite referred to himself and his fellow troops as "a republic on tachanki". The Revolutionary Insurrectionary Army of Ukraine used tachankas mainly against enemy cavalry. Makhnovists also used tachankas to transport infantry, thus improving mobility of the army (about 100 km each day). Tachankas soon became used by the Red Army, with the famous example of Vasily Chapayev.

Later, it was adopted by a number of armies, notably the Polish Army which used it during the Polish-Soviet War. Initially mostly improvised, with time the Polish Army also adopted two models of factory-made taczankas, as they were called in Poland.  They were used during the Invasion of Poland of 1939 to provide cavalry squadron support.  They were attached to every cavalry HMG squadron and HMG company of infantry.

Armament 

Despite a certain degree of standardisation, the tachanka's armament was, in most cases, improvised.  In Russia, the PM M1910 heavy machine gun was often used.  The Polish cavalry of the Polish-Soviet War often used all kinds of machine guns available, including the Maxim, Schwarzlose MG M.07/12, Hotchkiss machine gun and Browning machine gun.  The late models of standardised tachankas of the Polish Army were all equipped with Ckm wz.30, a Polish modification of the M1917 Browning machine gun which was also suitable for anti-air fire.

Cultural references 
One of the songs glorifying the Red Army during the Russian Civil War was called  "Tachanka".  The concluding lyrics, roughly translated, run:

And to this day, the foe has nightmares
Of the thick rain of lead,
The battle-chariot
And the young machine gunner.

Tachankas can be seen in the classic Soviet films such as Chapayev and The Burning Miles. A modern variant of tachanka can be seen in a cult Russian film Brother 2.

In the video game Tom Clancy's Rainbow Six Siege, there is a playable Russian operator by the name of Alexsandr "Tachanka" Senaviev, who operates a DP-27 light machinegun (which was originally on a tripod and had a bulletproof glass shield), and an incendiary grenade launcher.

See also 
 Tachanka (song)
 Aerosan
 Caracole
 Chariot
 Carroballista
 Drive-by shooting
 Horse artillery
 Portee
 Technical (vehicle)

References

External links

 Sounds of the Soviet Union's "Tachanka" folk song MP3 file (sung in Russian)
 Polish Tachankas
Carts
Cavalry
Military vehicles of Ukraine
Russian words and phrases
Russian inventions